Dougald Sinclair "Speed" Moynes (July 14, 1892 – June 21, 1984) was a Canadian professional ice hockey player. He played with the Vancouver Millionaires of the Pacific Coast Hockey Association. He also played for the Melville Millionaires in Saskatchewan, and after serving in World War I, the Trail Smoke Eaters. His nickname was a reference to his renowned speed, as he was one of the fastest skaters in hockey at the time. Moynes died in 1984 at a hospital in Trail, British Columbia.

References

External links

1892 births
1984 deaths
Canadian military personnel of World War I
Ice hockey people from Ontario
Sportspeople from Kawartha Lakes
Vancouver Millionaires players
Canadian ice hockey right wingers